Slovakian Airlines was a planned Slovak scheduled and charter airline based at Bratislava. It had one leased Boeing 737-500. It started to fly in 2011, but was sold after financial difficulty and ceased all operations in 2012.

References

 Google Translate
 Google Translate
 Google Translate
 Google Translate

Defunct airlines of Slovakia
Airlines established in 2011
Airlines disestablished in 2012
2012 disestablishments in Slovakia
Slovakian companies established in 2011